Victoria B. Mars (born 1956/1957) is an American billionaire heiress and businesswoman. She is a former chairwoman of Mars, Incorporated, and current chair of Salzburg Global Seminar.

Early life
Victoria Mars is a fourth generation member of the Mars family. She is the daughter of Forrest Mars Jr. and Virginia Cretella. She has three sisters: Marijke Mars, Pamela Mars-Wright and Valerie Mars. Her paternal great-grandfather, Franklin Clarence Mars, founded Mars, Incorporated in 1911. Her paternal great-grandmother, Ethel V. Mars, was a horsebreeder at Milky Way Farm in Giles County, Tennessee.

She attended Foxcroft School in Middleburg, Virginia, from which she graduated in 1974. She graduated from Yale University. She earned an MBA in Finance from the Wharton School of Business at the University of Pennsylvania in 1984.

Career
She started her career working for Mars, Incorporated in Haguenau, France in 1978, where she served as Assistant Brand Manager for Milky Way, followed by Export Manager. In 1984, she served as Director of the Marine Systems Division of Mars Electronics International. Two years later, in 1986, she was appointed Vice President of S&F, Commercial, and People and Organization for Dove of Burr Ridge, Illinois in suburban Chicago. A decade later, in 1997, she was appointed Ombudsman at Mars, Incorporated. She was still serving in that position in 2013.

She has served on the board of directors of Mars, Incorporated since 2006. Eight years later, in April 2014, she was appointed as its chairman, replacing Stephen M. Badger. She was a keynote speaker at the 2014 annual conference organized by Great Place to Work, a non-profit organization which promotes employee well-being.

In February 2015, she attended a meeting chaired by Annick Girardin, the French Minister of State for Development and Francophony, alongside Franck Riboud, the chairman of Danone, to launch the Livelihoods Funds, which promotes sustainable development in agribusiness on the African continent.

She inherited about 8 percent stake of Mars Inc. in 2016, which made her a billionaire. According to Forbes, her shares were valued worth of $5.9 billion as of March 2018.

Charity work
She served on the board of trustees of her alma mater, Foxcroft School.

She serves on the board of The Center for Large Landscape Conservation in Bozeman, Montana. She made charitable contributions to the Charles Darwin Foundation in 2003 and 2004. She also donated to the Galapagos Conservancy in 2007, 2008, 2009, 2010, 2011, 2012, and 2013.

She made donations to the Mystic Seaport, a maritime museum in Mystic, Connecticut, in 2011–2012. Additionally, she donated to the High Mountain Institute, a non-profit organization headquartered in Leadville, Colorado which teaches young people about the environment, in 2012 and 2013.

She was a donor to the Thorncroft Equestrian Center in Malvern, Pennsylvania in 2014.

Personal life
She has four children (Stephanie, Bernadette, Kimberly, and Andrew), two from her first marriage and two from her current marriage with David Spina.

References

Living people
Yale University alumni
Wharton School of the University of Pennsylvania alumni
American food industry business executives
American corporate directors
Mars family
American billionaires
Female billionaires
Year of birth missing (living people)
1950s births
Foxcroft School alumni